Charki Draiss (born 1955 in Fkih Ben Saleh) is a Moroccan civil servant and politician. Since 3 January 2012, he holds the position of Minister-Delegate for the Interior in  the cabinet of Abdelilah Benkirane.

Charki Draiss is a career civil servant and worked at the Ministry of Interior since he graduated with a degree in political science in 1977. He was Caid, Provincial then Regional Governor and was nominated in 2006 as the head the "DGSN" (General Directorate of National Security), Morocco's chief body for internal security.

See also
Cabinet of Morocco

References

Living people
Government ministers of Morocco
1955 births
People from Fkih Ben Saleh
Moroccan civil servants
Moroccan Caids